Erika Moore Taylor is a biomedical engineer, scientist, Assistant Professor, "Forbes 30 under 30 honoree," financial advisor, and the founder of a scholarship program that has been featured on CNBC.

Biography
In 2013, Erika received a Bachelor of Science in Biomedical Engineering from Johns Hopkins University in Baltimore, Maryland. In 2018, she went on to obtain a Doctor of Philosophy in Biomedical Engineering at Duke University in Durham, North Carolina. She returned to Johns Hopkins University in 2018 and remained there as a Provost's Postdoctoral Fellow until 2020. Taylor currently works as an Assistant Professor in the Department of Materials Science and Engineering at the University of Florida in Gainesville. She "specializes in the use of biomaterials to alter the immune response of the body.” She is aiming in particular to discover "applications for the autoimmune disorder lupus."

Distinctions
Taylor has earned many distinctions. Here is a selection of them:
 2017 Duke University Board of Trustees - Graduate Young Trustee
 2017 MIT Rising Stars in Biomedical Engineering and Science
 2018 Duke University Department of Biomedical Engineering - BME Award for Outstanding Doctoral Dissertation
 2021 Duke University Center of Exemplary Mentoring (UCEM) Research Summit - Keynote Speaker

Awards and honors
Taylor's track record of obtaining numerous scholarships, fellowships, and endowments is quite remarkable. Here are just a sampling of her winnings:
 2009 Johns Hopkins University - Hodson-Gilliam Success Scholar 
 2012 U.N.C.F./Merck Science Initiative - U.N.C.F./Merck Undergraduate Research Fellowship
 2013 Ford Foundation Fellowship
 2013 The Graduate School of Duke University - Dean's Graduate Fellowship
 2013 The Graduate School of Duke University - James B. Duke Fellowship
 2013 National Science Foundation -  NSF Graduate Research Fellow
 Herbert Wertheim College of Engineering at UF - Rhines Rising Star Larry Hench Professorship

Societies
Tau Beta Pi National Engineering Honor Society

Publications
Taylor has published many academic works including:

CD45+ Cells Present Within Mesenchymal Stem Cell Populations Affect Network Formation of Blood-Derived Endothelial Outgrowth Cells
Erica B. Peters, Nicolas Christoforou, Erika Moore, Jennifer L. West, and George A. Truskey - BioResearch Open Access, Vol. 4, No. 1 (2015)

Tumor Necrosis Factor Improves Vascularization in Osteogenic Grafts Engineered with Human Adipose-Derived Stem/Stromal Cells
Daphne L. Hutton, Renu Kondragunta, Erika Moore, Ben P. Hung, Xiaofeng Jia, Warren L. Grayson (2014)

Platelet-Derived Growth Factor and Spatiotemporal Cues Induce Development of Vascularized Bone Tissue by Adipose-Derived Stem Cells
Daphne L. Hutton, Erika M. Moore, Jeffrey M. Gimble, and Warren L. Grayson -  Tissue Engineering Part A Vol. 19, No. 17-18 (2013)

Vascular morphogenesis of adipose-derived stem cells is mediated by heterotypic cell-cell interactions 
Daphne L Hutton, Elizabeth A Logsdon, Erika M Moore, Feilim Mac Gabhann, Jeffrey M Gimble, Warren L Grayson - Tissue Eng Part A (2012)

Cost-effective therapeutic hypothermia treatment device for hypoxic ischemic encephalopathy
Kim J, Buchbinder N, Ammanuel S, Kim R, Moore E, O'Donnell N, Lee J, Kulikowicz E, Acharya S, Lee R, Johnston M (2013)

References

University of Florida faculty
Johns Hopkins University alumni
Duke University alumni
American women scientists
American women engineers
Biomedical engineers
Living people
Year of birth missing (living people)
American women academics
21st-century American women